Vice-Admiral Sir Arthur Allison Fitzroy Talbot KBE CB DSO & Bar DL (22 October 1909 – 16 June 1998) was a Royal Navy officer who went on to be Commander-in-Chief, Plymouth.

Naval career
Educated at the Royal Naval College, Dartmouth, Fitzroy Talbot joined the Royal Navy in 1926. He went to sea as a midshipman in the battleship HMS Royal Oak.

He served in World War II initially as commander of the 10th Anti-Submarine Striking Force in the North Sea and then as Commander of the 3rd Motor Gun Boat Flotilla in the Channel. Finally he was Chief of Staff to the Commodore, Western Isles.

After the War he became Chief Staff Officer (Operations) for the Far East Station before taking command of the frigate HMS Alert in 1949. In 1950 he was appointed Naval Attaché in Moscow and then, as Commander of 3rd Destroyer Squadron, he took part in the Suez Crisis in 1956 after which he became Commodore, Royal Navy Barracks, Portsmouth, in 1957. His next appointment was as Flag Officer, Arabian Seas and Persian Gulf, in 1960 before being made Commander-in-Chief, South Atlantic and South America, in 1963. He was made Commander-in-Chief, Plymouth, in 1965 and retired in 1967.

In retirement he became Deputy Lieutenant of Somerset in 1973.

Family
In 1940 he married Joyce Gertrude Linley; they went on to have two daughters. Following the death of his first wife, he married Elizabeth Durlacher in 1983.

Honours and awards
 25 June 1940 – Lieutenant Arthur Allison FitzRoy Talbot, Royal Navy, is appointed to be a Companion of the Distinguished Service Order for courage and resource in operations on the Norwegian Coast.
 10 June 1961 – Rear-Admiral Arthur Allison FitzRoy Talbot, DSO, is appointed to be a Companion of the Order of the Bath.
 1 January 1964 – Vice-Admiral Arthur Allison Fitzroy Talbot, CB, DSO, is appointed a Knight Commander of the Order of the British Empire.

References

|-

1909 births
1998 deaths
Knights Commander of the Order of the British Empire
Companions of the Order of the Bath
Royal Navy vice admirals
Deputy Lieutenants of Somerset
Companions of the Distinguished Service Order
Royal Navy personnel of World War II
Fitzroy Talbot